Batsheva Hay is an American fashion designer.

Early life and education 
Hay grew up in Queens, New York, in a secular Jewish household. She graduated from Stuyvesant High School. She was educated at Stanford and Georgetown. She has a B.A. from Stanford University, an M.A. in psychology, and a J.D. from Georgetown University Law Center.

Career 
In 2016, she visited a dressmaker to have a favorite vintage Laura Ashley dress remade, and decided that she wanted to focus on fashion. She established her own label, Batsheva.

In 2017, one of Hay's dresses was included in Vogue in their roundup called “How to Wear Fall’s Least Sexy Trends, from Clogs to Corduroys”.   

In 2018, Hay was a finalist for the CFDA/Vogue Fashion Fund and was awarded $150,000. She was part of New York Fashion Week in September 2018. Ella Emhoff, the stepdaughter of Vice President Kamala Harris, and Hay co-designed Emhoff's inauguration day dress in January 2021.

Personal life 
She is married to fashion photographer Alexei Hay and lives on the Upper West Side with their two children. They observe and practice Judaism.

References 

American fashion designers
People from Queens, New York
Stanford University alumni
Georgetown University Law Center alumni
Date of birth missing (living people)
Living people
Year of birth missing (living people)
Jewish fashion designers
American Jews
Jewish women in business
American women fashion designers
21st-century American women